Callum Sinclair (born 23 September 1989) is a professional Australian rules footballer who plays for the Sydney Swans in the Australian Football League (AFL). He was recruited by the West Coast Eagles with the 12th draft pick in the 2013 rookie draft. He made his debut in round 2, 2013, against  at Patersons Stadium.

Early life
Originally from Melbourne, Sinclair participated in the Auskick program at Elsternwick, Victoria and played for Port Melbourne Football Club in the Victorian Football League (VFL) before moving to Western Australia to play for Subiaco in the West Australian Football League (WAFL).  His father Allan played for Fitzroy and St Kilda in the 1970s.
Callum went to school at Caulfield Grammar School and played in their 2007 APS Premiership team as a Full Forward. He played most junior football with Beaumaris Football Club.  He also played for Old Caulfield Grammarians in VAFA and got selected for State Under 19 Football in 2008.

In 2010 his first season at Port Melbourne he was selected in the VFL team of the year Centre Half Forward. He missed selection in two AFL Drafts and  left for WA in 2012 to play with Subiaco in the WAFL and made selection as Centre Half Forward for the WA State team.  Injury interrupted his season however he played enough to get selected in the 2013 AFL draft.

AFL Career
Sinclair was drafted by the West Coast Eagles and made his AFL debut in round 2, 2013 against eventual premiers, Hawthorn Football Club. He played 5 consecutive games before his season was interrupted by injury. He returned to senior football in 2014, playing the first 3 rounds as relief ruck, before being dropped to the WAFL. He returned to the side, playing one more senior game for the season in round 17 against the Brisbane Lions.

In 2015, he missed the first 4 games of the season due to a fractured thumb, before returning to the side after 2 WAFL games. He missed just 2 more games for the rest of the season, playing 17 home and away games and 3 finals as relief ruck for Nic Naitanui. He was selected ahead of Scott Lycett in the 2015 AFL Grand Final against Hawthorn, amassing 10 hit outs and 4 handballs, in a losing team going down by 46 points. Following the grand final, he was traded to the Sydney Swans in a straight swap deal for the out-of-contract premiership player, Lewis Jetta.

Sinclair announced his retirement in August 2022.

Sinclair played 89 senior matches for the Sydney Swans and though he did not add to that tally in 2022, the ruckman played a vital role with the Swans VFL side.

Statistics
Updated to the end of round 23, 2022.

|-
| 2013
|style="text-align:center;"|
| 22 || 5 || 3 || 5 || 30 || 19 || 49 || 21 || 6 || 47 || 0.6 || 1 || 6 || 3.8 || 9.8 || 4.2 || 1.2 || 9.4 || 0
|-
| 2014
|style="text-align:center;"|
| 22 || 4 || 2 || 3 || 24 || 16 || 40 || 8 || 6 || 35 || 0.5 || 0.8 || 6 || 4 || 10 || 2 || 1.5 || 8.8 || 0
|-
| 2015
|style="text-align:center;"|
| 22 || 20 || 13 || 10 || 134 || 111 || 245 || 83 || 32 || 369 || 0.7 || 0.5 || 6.5 || 5.6 || 12.3 || 4.2 || 1.6 || 18.5 || 0
|-
| 2016
|style="text-align:center;"|
| 18 || 16 || 10 || 6 || 87 || 70 || 157 || 45 || 49 || 221 || 0.6 || 0.4 || 5.4 || 4.4 || 9.8 || 2.8 || 3.1 || 13.8 || 0
|-
| 2017
|style="text-align:center;"|
| 18 || 19 || 14 || 9 || 136 || 92 || 228 || 61 || 53 || 337 || 0.7 || 0.5 || 7.2 || 4.8 || 12.0 || 3.2 || 2.8 || 17.7 || 3
|-
| 2018
|style="text-align:center;"|
| 18 || 23 || 12 || 8 || 216 || 120 || 336 || 86 || 70 || 667 || 0.5 || 0.3 || 9.4 || 5.2 || 14.6 || 3.7 || 3.0 || 29.0 || 6
|-
| 2019
|style="text-align:center;"|
| 18 || 14 || 5 || 2 || 106 || 62 || 168 || 38 || 44 || 350 || 0.4 || 0.1 || 7.6 || 4.4 || 12.0 || 2.7 || 3.1 || 25.0 || 0
|-
| 2020
|style="text-align:center;"|
| 18 || 13 || 3 || 3 || 64 || 55 || 119 || 32 || 33 || 293 || 0.2 || 0.2 || 4.9 || 4.2 || 9.2 || 2.5 || 2.5 || 22.5 || 0
|-
| 2021
|style="text-align:center;"|
| 18 || 4 || 1 || 0 || 19 || 21 || 40 || 10 || 11 || 99 || 0.3 || 0.0 || 4.8 || 5.3 || 10.0 || 2.5 || 2.8 || 24.8 || 0
|-
| 2022
|style="text-align:center;"|
| 18 || 0 || – || – || – || – || – || – || – || – || – || – || – || – || – || – || – || – || –
|- class="sortbottom"
! colspan=3| Career
! 118
! 63
! 46
! 816
! 566
! 1382
! 384
! 304
! 2418
! 0.5
! 0.4
! 6.9
! 4.8
! 11.7
! 3.3
! 2.6
! 20.5
! 9
|}

See also
 List of Caulfield Grammar School people

References

External links

1989 births
Living people
West Coast Eagles players
Port Melbourne Football Club players
Subiaco Football Club players
Australian rules footballers from Melbourne
People educated at Caulfield Grammar School
Sydney Swans players